Cabestana africana is a species of predatory sea snail, a marine gastropod mollusk in the family Cymatiidae.

Description
The size of the shell varies between 60 mm and 115 mm.

Distribution
This marine species occurs off South Africa.

References

External links
 

Cymatiidae
Gastropods described in 1855